Knut Brofoss (born 9 October 1948) is a Norwegian civil servant.

He was born in Oslo as a son of Erik Brofoss. He took the cand.jur. degree, and was hired in the Ministry of Justice and the Police in 1975. From 1983 he worked in the Ministry of Social Affairs. He was deputy under-secretary of state from 1988 to 1999, and acting permanent under-secretary of state in 1999. From 1999 to 2000 he worked as a prosecutor in the Norwegian National Authority for the Investigation and Prosecution of Economic and Environmental Crime. He then became general director of the Norwegian Institute for Alcohol and Drug Research. In 2005 he was appointed as director of the National Insurance Court.

He is married to Ingse Stabel.

References

1948 births
Living people
Norwegian civil servants
Norwegian jurists